Ana Catarina Martins Cunha Monteiro (born 14 August 1993) is a Portuguese swimmer. She competed in the women's 200 metre butterfly at the 2019 World Aquatics Championships. She competed in the women's 200 metre butterfly at the 2020 Summer Olympics.

References

External links
 

1993 births
Living people
People from Vila do Conde
Portuguese female butterfly swimmers
Mediterranean Games medalists in swimming
Swimmers at the 2018 Mediterranean Games
Swimmers at the 2022 Mediterranean Games
Mediterranean Games silver medalists for Portugal
Swimmers at the 2020 Summer Olympics
Olympic swimmers of Portugal
Sportspeople from Porto District
21st-century Portuguese women